Hotel by the Hour is a 1970 West German crime film directed by Rolf Olsen and starring Curd Jürgens, Andrea Rau, and Corny Collins. It is set in the red-light district of St. Pauli in Hamburg. A Stundenhotel is a motel where rooms are let by the hour, similar to Japanese love hotels.

The film's sets were designed by the art director Ernst H. Albrecht.

Cast

References

Bibliography

External links 
 

1970 films
Films set in Hamburg
West German films
German crime films
1970 crime films
1970s German-language films
Films directed by Rolf Olsen
Police detective films
Films about prostitution in Germany
Films set in hotels
1970s German films